Raffles Girls' School (RGS) is an independent girls' secondary school located in Braddell, Singapore. Established in 1879, it is one of the oldest schools in Singapore. RGS, together with its affiliated school Raffles Institution, offers a six-year Raffles Programme, which allows students to skip the Singapore-Cambridge GCE Ordinary Level examinations and proceed to take the Singapore-Cambridge GCE Advanced Level examinations at the end of Year 6.

The school was recognised by the Ministry of Education in 2006 by being awarded the School Excellence Award (recognising schools with 'exemplary school processes and practices'), among other awards.

It was a member of Alliance of Girls' Schools Australasia.

History

Before RGS became a school in its own right, it existed as a section of Raffles Institution (RI).

The precursor to RGS opened in the RI campus of Bras Basah Road on 4 March 1844 with 11 students, five day-scholars and six boarders, who were clothed, fed and instructed by the RI management. The demand for education grew and in 1847, the school moved to RI's eastern wing, extending towards Bras Basah Road. Edmund Augustus Blundell, the Governor of the Straits Settlement, described the school as "a female school designed for the education and religious training of the children of poor Protestant parents" in 1855. In 1871, the school moved into a house, the George Family's Old Mansion at the corner of Bras Basah Road. In 1879, the school separated from RI and M. Nelson was appointed the school's first headmistress. Together with three assistants, she ran the school which had an enrolment of 77. Since then, 1879 has been officially regarded as the year of the founding of RGS.

On 21 October 2019, RGS moved from Anderson Road, where it had been located since 1959, to its new campus at Braddell Rise, located opposite RI.

School culture and identity

Uniform

The usual school uniform is a belted, deep blue pinafore and a white collared blouse. Students customarily fold their sleeves on most shirts (except PE shirt), which also requires a colour-coded nametag (colours Black/Green (green as of 2019) Blue, Red and Yellow inherited by first-year batch to graduating batch respectively), along with the school badge, on the top left of the uniform, right below the name tag. There are also school culottes, worn with the PE shirt.

Awards and accolades 
A group of four students from RGS emerged Champion at the Kids' Lit Quiz 2018, and represented Singapore in New Zealand in July that year.

Joseph Toh Kim Leng won the Teaching Award in 2016, which honours outstanding teachers of English language, English literature and General Paper in Singapore.

Jodie Lai, a 2015 Optimist World Championships Under-15 champion, was conferred the title of Best Sportsgirl for sailing at the 46th Singapore Schools Sports Council (SSSC) Colours Awards in 2016.

Veronica Shen won the Queen's Commonwealth Essay Competition in the Junior Category in 2019 with her poem entitled 'Lost'. Earlier, Amanda Chong also won the Queen's Commonwealth Essay Competition in 2004.

Notable alumnae

 Ang Swee Chai, orthopaedic surgeon and co-founder of Medical Aid for Palestinians
 Kit Chan, singer and actress
 Beatrice Chia, actress and director
 Annabel Chong, former pornographic actress
 Chua Sock Koong, former SingTel group chief executive officer
 Joanna Dong, singer, actress and television host
 Faizah Jamal, legal academic and former nominated member of parliament
 Intan Azura Mokhtar, former member of parliament for Ang Mo Kio GRC
 Amy Khor, member of parliament for Hong Kah North SMC
 Stella Kon, playwright best known for her play "Emily of Emerald Hill"
 Lee Choo Neo, first female medical practitioner in Singapore
 Jane Lee, first woman from Southeast Asia to scale the Seven Summits
 Lee Tzu Pheng, award-winning poet
 Lim Hwee Hua, first female Cabinet minister in Singapore
 Corrinne May, singer-songwriter
 Denise Phua, member of parliament for Jalan Besar GRC
 Judith Prakash, first female judge in the Court of Appeal
 Quah Ting Wen, national swimmer
 Rahayu Mahzam, member of parliament for Jurong GRC
 Sim Ann, member of parliament for Holland-Bukit Timah GRC
 Siow Lee Chin, violinist
 Stefanie Sun, singer-songwriter
 Leaena Tambyah, founder of Singapore's first school for children with multiple disabilities
 Carrie Tan, member of parliament for Nee Soon GRC
 Margaret Leng Tan, pianist
 Tan Pin Pin, film-maker
 Tang Pui Wah, Singapore's first female Olympian
 Tay Kewei, singer-songwriter and founder of Sparkle Life Music
 Jackie Yi-Ru Ying, nanotechnology scientist
 Emma Yong, actress
 Zhang Jingna, photographer and Forbes 30 Under 30 Asia honoree

References

External links

Raffles Institution
 Raffles Girls' School (Secondary) website
 Raffles Institution website
 Raffles Institution (Secondary)
 Raffles Institution (Junior College)
 Raffles Programme website

Secondary schools in Singapore
Independent schools in Singapore
Schools offering Integrated Programme in Singapore
Educational institutions established in 1879
Orchard, Singapore
Girls' schools in Singapore
Schools in Central Region, Singapore
1879 establishments in Singapore